Kylie Duarte (born April 23, 1993 in Woonsocket, Rhode Island) is an American former competitive pair skater. With Colin Grafton, she is the 2012 U.S. junior bronze medalist and finished eighth at the 2012 World Junior Championships in Minsk. The pair announced the end of their partnership on October 17, 2012, with Duarte retiring from competition.

Programs 
(with Grafton)

Competitive highlights 
(with Grafton)

References

External links 

 
 Kylie Duarte / Colin Grafton at Ice Network

American female pair skaters
1993 births
Living people
People from Woonsocket, Rhode Island
21st-century American women
20th-century American women